Tarzetta catinus is a species of apothecial fungus belonging to the family Pyronemataceae. This is a largely European species with a few records from Mexico and the United States. It appears from spring to autumn as cream-coloured cups up to 5 cm across, usually in small groups among broad-leaved trees, especially beech. The rather similar Tarzetta cupularis is usually a smaller, deeper, flask-shaped cup, but the two species can only be reliably distinguished microscopically: by the shape of the spores (those of T. catinus being broader) and the paraphyses (those of T. catinus having distinctive lobed tips).

The species is inedible.

References

Sources

External links
Tarzetta catinus at Species Fungorum
Tarzetta catinus at GBIF

Pyronemataceae
Fungi described in 1799

Inedible fungi